Milecastle 14 (March Burn) was a milecastle of the Roman Hadrian's Wall.

Construction 
Milecastle 14 was a short-axis milecastle with unknown gateway type (though the dimensions of the north gateway were found to match those of Milecastle 37, and the gateway had been blocked up some time after construction.)  Short axis milecastles (Type I) were thought to have been constructed by the Legio II Augusta who were based in Isca Augusta (Caerleon).

Excavations and investigations
1930 – The earthworks of the Milecastle platform are identified from an aerial photograph.
1946 – Stevens investigated the milecastle, identifying the measurements and state of the north gate.  Any remaining evidence of the south gate had been ploughed away.

1966 – English Heritage Field Investigation.  The previous description was confirmed.
1989 – English Heritage Field Investigation.  No additional information.

Associated turrets 
Each milecastle on Hadrian's Wall had two associated turret structures.  These turrets were positioned approximately one-third and two-thirds of a Roman mile to the west of the Milecastle, and would probably have been manned by part of the milecastle's garrison.  The turrets associated with Milecastle 14 are known as Turret 14A and Turret 14B.

Turret 14A
Horsley reported  seeing the turret, but is ambiguous with regard to the location.

Approximate location:

Turret 14B
No trace has been found of Turret 14B.

Expected location:

Monument records

References

Bibliography

14